God of War Ragnarök is an action-adventure game developed by Santa Monica Studio and published by Sony Interactive Entertainment. It was released worldwide on November 9, 2022, for the PlayStation 4 and PlayStation 5, marking the first cross-gen release in the God of War series. It is the ninth installment in the series, the ninth chronologically, and the sequel to 2018's God of War. Loosely based on Norse mythology, the game is set in ancient Scandinavia and features series protagonist, Kratos, and his teenage son, Atreus. Concluding the Norse era of the series, the game covers Ragnarök, the eschatological event which is central to Norse mythology and was foretold to happen in the previous game after Kratos killed the Aesir god Baldur.

The gameplay is similar to the previous 2018 installment. It features combo-based combat, as well as puzzle and role-playing elements. The gameplay has been revamped from the previous game: in addition to Kratos' main weapons, a magical battle axe and his double-chained blades, he also acquires a magical spear and his shield has become more versatile, with different types of shields that have differing offensive and defensive abilities. His son Atreus, as well as some other characters, provide assistance in combat and can be passively controlled. Additionally, and for the first time in the series, there are some story missions where the player takes full control of Atreus; his gameplay is similar to Kratos, but he uses his magical bow as his weapon. There are also more enemy types and mini-bosses than in the previous game. Originally slated for a 2021 release, the game was delayed in part due to Kratos actor Christopher Judge's health problems in August 2019, and later, the impact of the COVID-19 pandemic on development.

Ragnarök garnered universal acclaim from critics and was praised for its storytelling, characters, visuals, level design, music, and overall improvements to the gameplay over its predecessor. It won Game of the Year at the Titanium Awards and was a nominee for the same award at The Game Awards 2022, where it won Best Narrative, Best Action/Adventure, and Innovation in Accessibility, among other awards and nominations. It also won Adventure Game of the Year at the 26th Annual D.I.C.E. Awards. It received a leading fourteen nominations at the 19th British Academy Games Awards, the most nominations for any game in the history of the BAFTA awards. The game was a commercial success, selling 5.1 million units in its first week, becoming the fastest-selling first-party game in PlayStation history. By early February 2023, 11 million copies of the game had been sold.

Gameplay

 
God of War Ragnarök is a third-person action-adventure game. It features an over-the-shoulder free camera, while cinematographically, the game is presented in a continuous shot, with no camera cuts or loading screens. The gameplay is similar to the previous installment, God of War (2018), and like that game, it is single-player-only. Throughout the game, players battle Norse mythological foes, with more enemy types than in the prior entry. In addition to enemies found in the previous game, some newer enemy types include einherjar, wyverns, stalkers (centaur-like creatures with antlers), phantoms, human raiders, and nokkens, among many others. The developers also added more mini-bosses to give the game more variety.

The player primarily controls the character Kratos in combo-based combat and puzzle game elements. Kratos' main weapons are a magical battle axe called the Leviathan Axe, and his signature double-chained blades, the Blades of Chaos. He also has a shield, the original version of which is called the Guardian Shield. Kratos also utilizes hand-to-hand combat. The Leviathan Axe is infused with ice elemental magic. It can be thrown at enemies and magically summoned back to his hand, similar to Thor's hammer Mjölnir. The weapon can be thrown at environmental objects to trigger a damaging explosion, and freeze objects and some enemies in place for puzzle-solving until resummoned. The Blades of Chaos, infused with fire elemental magic, are a pair of blades attached to chains that can be swung around in various maneuvers. A new mechanic for Ragnarök is that the blades can be used like a grappling hook to traverse over chasms, and pick up objects to hurl at enemies. Kratos also obtains a new weapon called the Draupnir Spear, a close- and long-range attack spear that is infused with wind elemental magic and can make copies of itself; Kratos can throw multiple spears at an enemy, then have them all explode at once. The spear is also used to traverse or unblock certain pathways. Each weapon has standard light and heavy attacks. They can be upgraded with runes to allow for magical runic attacks, with slots for a light and heavy magical attack, providing players with a variety of options for their own play style. The triangle button on the controller was also changed for Ragnarök. In the previous game the button was only used to summon Kratos' axe back to his hand but if he already had the axe, nothing happened. Now, the button additionally allows the player to use "Weapon Signature Moves" to unleash a powerful magical attack depending on the weapon equipped. Another added mechanic is that if on a higher ledge, the player can leap down to perform a powerful weapon attack on enemies below.

In the previous game, the shield was only used for blocking and could perform a minor parry attack, and while multiple shields could be obtained, they were only cosmetic, changing the color of the Guardian Shield. For Ragnarök, the shield was revamped for versatility; different shields can be obtained and used offensively or defensively depending on which is equipped. Smaller shields are more for parrying while larger ones are more defensive. For example, the Dauntless Shield has a parry attack that when triggered correctly, Kratos smashes the shield into a foe that tosses and stuns enemies. Conversely, guarding with the Stonewall Shield raises its kinetic energy and once it is fully charged, the player can slam the shield into the ground, emitting a large wave of energy that knocks back enemies. When not in use, the shield folds up and appears like a vambrace on Kratos' left forearm. Kratos' Spartan Rage ability was also updated to three variants: Fury, Valor, and Wrath. Fury is the standard mode for Spartan Rage and is identical to the previous game in which Kratos uses bare handed attacks to greatly damage enemies. Valor consumes rage energy to restore health and can also be used as a parry if activated at the right time, while Wrath unleashes a powerful weapon attack depending on what weapon is equipped.

Like the previous game, while the player plays as Kratos, his son Atreus provides assistance through artificial intelligence (AI), helping in combat, traversal, exploration, and puzzle-solving. The player can passively control Atreus by dictating where he fires his arrows with his bow, either in combat or for puzzle-solving, as well as what magical spectral animals he can summon to further assist with combat. Additionally, Atreus' combat was updated to reflect his character's growth. In the previous game, Atreus was watching Kratos and learning how to fight, while in this game, Atreus has matured. He has longer chained combos, may initiate a fight before Kratos, and his magical abilities were expanded. There are also points in the game where another character will accompany Kratos instead of Atreus and they too can be passively controlled. For the first time in the series, the player can play entirely as a character other than Kratos (not including Ascensions multiplayer). This only occurs during some story missions when Atreus goes off on his own without Kratos and the player takes full control of Atreus. His gameplay is similar to Kratos in that he has close range combat by hitting enemies with his bow, and he has long range attacks by using his bow to shoot arrows. Additionally, he has special magical arrows, can create a shield from magic, and can summon magical spectral animals to assist in combat. Atreus also has his own rage ability in which he transforms into a wolf (and later, a bear) to deal greater damage. During these missions, Atreus typically has another character accompanying him and the player can passively control this character just as they do with Atreus when playing as Kratos. For some missions, Atreus has a magical floating sword called Ingrid that replaces the accompanying character.

The game retains the role-playing video game (RPG) elements of the 2018 installment. This includes the crafting system with many of the same resources to create new armor or upgrade existing armor and weapons with better perks. There are also many side quests found outside the game's core narrative. Ragnarök also adds armor transmogrification, which allows the player to change the appearance of their equipped armor to any other acquired armor without losing any of the equipped armor's stats. To transmog, however, the equipped piece of armor has to be fully upgraded.

Ragnarök has over 70 accessibility options. The game's user interface (UI) system was redesigned "to allow for more flexibility and readability", and more customization options for combat and interaction systems were also added. All accessibility features from the 2018 installment were retained but also expanded upon to allow players to adjust the gameplay to suit their own play style and needs.

Synopsis

Setting
Like the 2018 installment, Ragnarök is set in the world of Norse mythology, taking place three years after the previous game. While only six of the nine realms of Norse mythology could be explored in the 2018 game, Ragnarök sees the player exploring each of the nine realms, and unlike the previous installment, all nine realms are visited as part of the story; the fiery realm Muspelheim and the fog realm Niflheim, now covered with ice and snow, were previously just optional realms to explore. The other returning realms include Alfheim, the home of the dark and light Elves, Helheim, the land of the dead, and Jötunheim, the land of the Giants. Midgard, the primary realm of the 2018 installment, has become a frigid wasteland, dramatically changed by Fimbulwinter, a three-year long winter that began upon the conclusion of the previous game. The Lake of the Nine, previously navigable by means of a boat in the previous game, is now frozen over. Previously inaccessible realms include Svartalfheim, the industrial abode of the Dwarves; Vanaheim, the lush home of the Vanir gods as well as the giant wolves Sköll and Hati; and Asgard, the humble home of the Æsir gods that is only visited as part of the story and cannot be accessed after its conclusion.

Characters

The main protagonists are Kratos (played by Christopher Judge) and his teenage son, Atreus (Sunny Suljic). Kratos is the former Greek God of War, while Atreus is half Giant, one-quarter god, and one-quarter mortal and is also referred to by his Giant name, Loki. Since the conclusion of the previous game, Kratos and Atreus have been in hiding at their home in Scandinavia in the realm of Midgard, training for the inevitable battle ahead of them. Other major characters include Mímir (Alastair Duncan), the smartest man alive and the pair's loyal companion, providing knowledge and counsel; Freya (Danielle Bisutti), a Vanir goddess, former Queen of the Valkyries, and Odin's ex-wife, also known as Frigg, who seeks revenge against Kratos and Atreus for the death of her son, Baldur; the Huldra Brothers, Brok (Robert Craighead) and Sindri (Adam Harrington), a pair of dwarven blacksmiths who assist Kratos and Atreus by forging new gear and also found a way to travel to other realms without using the realm travel table in Týr's Temple; and Angrboda (Laya De Leon Hayes), one of the last remaining Giants who had been in hiding in Jötunheim in a secluded forest called the Ironwood and protecting its animals.

The game's primary antagonist is the Aesir god Odin (Richard Schiff), the king of Asgard and Allfather of the Nine Realms. An unseen character in the previous game, he is a pathological liar and manipulator obsessed with preventing his death at Ragnarök and will take any means to stop it. He lost an eye while looking into a rift between worlds in hopes of finding answers to prevent the catastrophic event. His ravens, including Huginn and Muninn, allow him and the Aesir to travel freely to any realm, and they are his watchful eyes over the realms. Thor (Ryan Hurst), the Aesir God of Thunder and eldest son of Odin, serves as a secondary antagonist; he is the half-brother of Baldur and father of Modi and Magni, all of whom Kratos and Atreus killed in the previous game. He wields the hammer Mjölnir, with which he slays Giants, despite being part-Giant himself, and does the bidding of his father despite being constantly belittled by him. Another antagonist is the Aesir god Heimdall (Scott Porter), another son of Odin and half-brother to Thor who has a superiority complex and believes himself to be untouchable due to his foresight ability. Known as the "Herald of Ragnarök", he watches over Asgard for threats, rides atop the horse Gulltoppr, and possesses the magical horn Gjallarhorn that signals the start of Ragnarök and opens simultaneous realm travel to Asgard. A minor antagonist is Grýla (Debra Wilson), Angrboda's estranged grandmother in Jötunheim who steals animal souls to experience their memories.

Other characters include Freyr (Brett Dalton), Freya's Vanir twin brother who has been leading a resistance against Odin and the Aesir in Vanaheim; Týr (Ben Prendergast), the Norse God of War but a peaceful one who was thought to have been killed by Odin prior to the events of the previous game; Sif (Emily Rose), Thor's golden-haired Aesir wife who wants Thor to stand up to Odin; Thrúd (Mina Sundwall), the daughter of Thor and Sif who dreams of becoming a Valkyrie and is unaware of Odin's true nature; the three Norns, who are the Fates of Norse mythology—Urð (Kate Miller), the Norn associated with the past, Verðandi (Emily O'Brien), the Norn associated with the present, and Skuld (Shelby Young), the Norn associated with the future; Surtr (Chris Browning), a fire Giant who lives in Muspelheim; and Kratos' second wife—Atreus' mother—Laufey (Deborah Ann Woll), a Giantess who goes by Faye for short and had died shortly before the start of the previous game—in Ragnarök, she appears in flashbacks to Kratos, preparing him for her death and her final wish, which was the basis of the previous game.

Plot
Near the end of Fimbulwinter, Kratos and Atreus return home—fending off an ambush from a vengeful Freya—to find their wolf Fenrir in his final moments. Atreus' grief transforms him into a bear through his still-uncontrolled Giant and godly magic, briefly battling Kratos before returning to his senses. Thor arrives with Odin, who proposes leaving them alone if Atreus abandons his secret search for Týr. Kratos refuses and duels Thor to a stalemate, but Odin tells Atreus he will leave Kratos alone if the former comes to Asgard. Kratos, Atreus, and Mímir take refuge in Sindri's home Yggdrasil, in the centre of the nine realms.

Atreus admits he and Sindri have been searching for clues about Týr's whereabouts. Kratos reluctantly agrees to help Atreus; they travel to Svartalfheim and rescue a pacifistic Týr. The group head to Gróa's shrine in Alfheim to understand the prophecy concerning Ragnarök, and learn Gróa lied: only Asgard is fated to being destroyed but all other realms survive under a new champion, implied to be Atreus using the name Loki.

Kratos and Atreus argue over the latter's supposed destiny. That night, Atreus is magically transported to Jötunheim where he meets the Giantess Angrboda, who shows him a mural foretelling Kratos' death in Ragnarök and Atreus serving Odin. Atreus learns the Giants transferred their souls into spiritual stones; he is entrusted with them and puts a Giant's soul into a snake's body. Atreus returns to Midgard, where he and Kratos are attacked by Freya. She agrees to spare Kratos if he helps her break the curse binding her to Midgard—she circumvents it by taking form as a falcon. In Vanaheim, where Freya's estranged brother Freyr leads a resistance against Odin, Kratos opens up to Freya about his first family's deaths in Greece and the emptiness of revenge. After breaking the curse, Freya and Kratos make amends.

Kratos and Atreus argue regarding the latter's deceitful behavior; Atreus flees to Asgard to find a way to prevent Kratos's death. Odin requests his help in preventing Ragnarök by reassembling an ancient mask that can supposedly grant infinite knowledge. Meanwhile, Kratos, Freya, and Mímir visit the Norns, who say Heimdall is destined to kill Atreus. Kratos and Brok forge the Draupnir ring into a powerful spear, capable of harming Heimdall. In Helheim, Atreus releases the soulless giant wolf Garm, who begins tearing holes in the realms. After reuniting with Kratos, Atreus, realizing Fenrir's soul was bound to his knife when he died, resurrects Fenrir by transferring his soul into Garm. Kratos and Atreus then reconcile. With Mímir and Freya, they return to Vanaheim to rescue Freyr from the Aesir. Kratos is forced to kill Heimdall and claims Gjallarhorn, setting Ragnarök in motion.

Atreus infiltrates Asgard and steals the mask. At the refuge, Týr agrees to fight; suspicious of Týr's change of heart, Brok realizes he is calling Atreus "Loki", like Asgardians. Týr fatally stabs Brok, revealing he had been Odin in disguise. The group drives him away but a grief-stricken Sindri blames Atreus for Brok's death and abandons the group. Atreus and Kratos commit to Ragnarök, entering Muspelheim to help Surtr achieve a destined primordial form that will destroy Asgard.

The united forces of the realms gather under Kratos' leadership; he sounds Gjallarhorn to begin the siege of Asgard. The battle begins poorly; the Elves and Vanir struggle with Asgard's defenses, Sindri comes alone to avoid more dwarven deaths, and the army is forced to rescue innocent Midgardian refugees. However, the tide turns when Angrboda arrives with Fenrir and the snake Atreus saved, now fully grown into Jörmungandr, who distracts Thor while Sindri destroys Asgard's protective wall. Thrúd and Sif defect after discovering Odin used refugees as shields. Thor knocks Jörmungandr back in time and engages Kratos in battle, but is convinced to stand down to help his family, only to be killed by Odin for disobeying. Kratos, Atreus, Freya, and Mímir overpower and defeat Odin; Atreus shatters the mask and traps Odin's soul in a spiritual stone, which a vengeful Sindri smashes. Freyr sacrifices himself so everyone can flee as Surtr destroys Asgard.

In Midgard, Atreus reunites with Angrboda, who shows him and Kratos a mural Faye had destroyed so they could determine their own fate. Atreus resolves to find surviving Giants in other lands, and bids a heartfelt farewell to Kratos. Kratos discovers a mural depicting him as a revered, peaceful god. He recruits Freya and Mímir to rebuild and restore peace. Asgard's Einherjar are cleared out, Freya kills the vengeful Valkyrie Queen Gná and reclaims her mantle, the Aesir relocate to Vanaheim and achieve peace with the Vanir, Thrúd wields Mjölnir to honor Thor, and the real Týr is freed in Niflheim. In the secret ending, Kratos, Freya, Mímir, and an unforgiving Sindri attend a funeral for Brok in Svartalfheim.

Development
A sequel to 2018's God of War was teased at the end of that game; it ended with Ragnarök looming, as well as a secret ending that showed a vision of Thor confronting Kratos and Atreus at the end of Fimbulwinter. Although he did not officially announce a new game at the time, that game's director, Cory Barlog, confirmed that the 2018 installment would not be Kratos' last game, and it was later revealed that future games would continue to be set in the Norse environment and include Atreus. In April 2019, a teaser came in the form of a PlayStation 4 (PS4) dynamic background theme; the side of Kratos and Atreus' boat had runes that translated to "Ragnarök is coming". At the same time, in order to celebrate the first anniversary of the previous game's release, Barlog posted a thread of tweets on Twitter with pictures and a statement concerning the development process; some fans noticed that the first letter of each tweet spelled out "Ragnarök is coming". During the 2020 PlayStation 5 (PS5) Showcase event on September 16, a new God of War was officially announced for a 2021 release on the newer console. The short trailer, which had a voice over by Kratos actor Christopher Judge, did not officially reveal the name of the sequel, but just like the previous teasers, the trailer stated that "Ragnarök is coming". This led some sources to believe the title of the game to be God of War: Ragnarök, but at the time, this was not confirmed by Sony. The tagline implied that this would be the start of Ragnarök in the God of War universe, which in Norse mythology is a series of events that bring about the end of days and the deaths of the Norse gods.

When the game was first announced in September 2020, it was only announced as a PS5 title. However, after Sony Interactive Entertainment revealed their plans to support their previous console until at least 2022, speculation began on whether the new God of War would see a cross-gen release on the PS4, as some other titles that were originally thought to be PS5 exclusives were also announced to release on PS4 (e.g., Horizon Forbidden West). In June 2021, it was confirmed that the game would release on both the PS4 and PS5, in turn marking the first cross-gen release in the series. After the 2018 installment was ported to Windows (PC) in January 2022, Barlog was questioned on if Ragnarök would see a PC release, but he was unsure, stating it was Sony's decision, but did say they learned a few things about porting to PC if they were to do it again.

By February 2021, neither Sony nor the game's developer, Santa Monica Studio, had given any updates regarding the game's release, prompting Barlog to tweet that the game would be out "when it's done". In June 2021, head of PlayStation Studios, Hermen Hulst, stated that Sony had decided to delay the game until 2022 to ensure that Santa Monica could deliver on their desired gaming experience for players. Santa Monica Studio issued a statement regarding the game's delay, which said that while they were focused on delivering a top-quality game, they also wanted to maintain the safety of those involved with the development. The game's music composer, Bear McCreary, who also composed the music for the previous game, responded to the news of the delay, saying that it would be worth the wait.

Development was partly impacted by the COVID-19 pandemic, as Hulst stated that there were issues getting access to performance capture and talent. The delay also brought a unique issue with Atreus actor Sunny Suljic, who was going through puberty during the time of production. His voice had changed a lot, especially during the delay, according to supervising dialogue designer Jodie Kupsco, who said "We had to go in and even out that performance so [that in the game] it sounds like it took place over a short period of time". Senior producer Ariel Angelotti said there were no changes to cinematics as a result of the delay, they just had to get creative in how they made the content. In following pandemic guidelines, Angelotti said that they had actors "stand in" for other characters in some scenes. For example, an actor for a main character would stand in as a background character "to be able to avoid a situation where too many people were on-set". In a series of tweets posted by Judge in late September, he said that he was the reason that the game was delayed due to surgery he needed in August 2019. Judge said that Santa Monica allowed him time to recover and waited for him to rehabilitate before continuing production. He also revealed that he had briefly quit the game after finding out that Eric Williams would be directing the sequel. Judge was uncertain about Williams; however, Barlog, who served as a producer and creative director on Ragnarök, was able to convince Judge that Williams was fully capable of directing the game, which Judge affirmed after working with him.

During Sony's May 2021 investment filing, they included a title treatment for the game which stated the title as God of War: Ragnarök, although the investment filing was later changed to state only "God of War". A report found that the logo used in the filing was unofficial and fan-made. Following this, various media outlets were uncertain of the legitimacy of the title of the game. In a statement to IGN, a Sony representative stated that the game's logo and title were not yet finalized or official, and that the inclusion of the false logo in the investment filing was an error. However, the game's title was in fact confirmed to be God of War Ragnarök (without a colon) during the 2021 PlayStation Showcase event on September 9.

It was also during this event that Eric Williams, who worked on every previous installment, was confirmed as the game's director, continuing the previous era's tradition of having a different director for each game. Also during the event, it was confirmed that Ragnarök would conclude the Norse era of the series. The main reason Santa Monica decided to end the Norse era with Ragnarök was due to the game's size and scale. The 2018 installment and Ragnarök each respectively took five years to develop, and they did not want to take another five years, totaling 15 years, to tell one story. Barlog also compared it to watching the extended editions of The Lord of the Rings film trilogy, stating that being able to condense the story to two games was similar to the feeling of watching that trilogy of films, as the consumer would feel they were told a complete story with a definitive beginning and end. Lead writer Rich Gaubert said there were pros and cons to doing a trilogy or ending the Norse era at two games. The developers debated on this and said that Ragnarök could have been split into two games, as it was much larger in scope than they had originally planned. They also had worry if Ragnarök would do the apocalyptic concept justice in just one game. This caused some of the team to have concern if the game would be good as they thought Ragnarök was going to be two games because they were originally in the mindset that the Norse era was going to be a trilogy. The decision to end the Norse era with Ragnarök was ultimately left to Barlog. Both Williams and Barlog had to convince the team that they would be doing Ragnarök as one game, and Williams said that although they had to make adjustments for pacing, the story was not scaled back.

Barlog told Williams that with the second game concluding the Norse saga, the three important plot aspects of the story that had to be retained were that Ragnarök would happen, Atreus would depart from Kratos in the game's conclusion, and Brok would be killed off, which was a decision Barlog had made back during the development of the 2018 installment, as Brok was described as the "family dog". Thematically, the game explores what kind of man Kratos would be without his son, and what kind of god would Atreus be without his father. Narrative director Matt Sophos revealed that during early development, there was an idea pitched in which Kratos died during his first battle with Thor and then there would have been a 20-year time jump where Atreus would rescue him from Helheim. Williams rejected the idea, as he did not like it, and also, he did not want to repeat a plot sequence that had been done a couple of times during the Greek games. The emotion and main hook of Ragnaröks actual story were also missing in this proposed idea, and the actual ending worked better for what they wanted to do, which was to say that prophecy and fate are not predetermined. Williams also said that there would likely not be a story-based expansion pack post-launch.

On July 6, 2022, a new cinematic trailer was unveiled, which confirmed a worldwide release date of November 9, 2022. During Sony's 2022 State of Play event on September 13, a new story trailer was shown, featuring new gameplay and cinematics. Brief glimpses of Odin and a battle with Thor were shown, as well as the giant wolves Sköll and Hati, among other returning characters. Just like the 2018 installment, Ragnarök was done in one shot. Additionally, the game supports options for players to run the game in either higher resolution or better performance, including 4K resolution at 30 frames per second (fps), 1080p resolution at 60fps, a high frame resolution mode in 4K at 40fps, and a high frame performance mode that syncs to 120 hertz. The latter two high frame options are only available for the PS5 version of the game and require monitors with HDMI 2.1. Animation director Bruno Velazquez stated that Santa Monica wanted to ensure that Ragnarök was the best it could possibly be on the PS4, and as such, it does not fully utilize the capabilities of the PS5. Velazquez said that the PS4 version is a visual improvement over the 2018 installment and noted that all of the studio's design goals were achieved on the PS4 version, so the PS5 version "is essentially an enhancement of what's already possible [on the PS4]". The game does, however, include several features exclusive to the PS5 hardware, such as 3D audio, haptic feedback, higher frame rate, and overall better graphics. In terms of design, Velazquez said there were no compromises for the PS4 version and that the game would essentially be the same experience on both consoles. Santa Monica confirmed that the game would have a photo mode, but that it would not be available at launch and would instead be added in a post-launch update.

On October 7, 2022, Santa Monica announced that the game had gone gold. Additionally, it was revealed that eight other studios contributed to the development of Ragnarök, including PlayStation Studios Creative Arts, Valkyrie Entertainment, Bluepoint Games, Red Hot, SuperAlloy Interactive, Jetpack Interactive, Super Genius, and Original Force. The exact contribution from each studio was not detailed, except SuperAlloy, which worked on motion capture. SuperAlloy specifically assisted with combat choreography, and the studio provided stunt coordination and stunt work for the game and key characters. Eric Jacobus also revealed that he again did the combat motion capture for Kratos, just as he did in the 2018 installment, as well as for some other characters.

Casting
During the 2021 PlayStation Showcase event, game director Eric Williams revealed that Richard Schiff would portray Odin. Other casting announcements included Ryan Hurst as Thor, Ben Prendergast as Týr, Laya De Leon Hayes as Angrboda, and Usman Ally as a dwarf named Durlin. In addition to Christopher Judge and Sunny Suljic returning as Kratos and Atreus, respectively, it was confirmed that Danielle Bisutti and Alastair Duncan would be reprising their respective roles as Freya and Mímir, and that Robert Craighead and Adam J. Harrington would reprise their respective roles as the Huldra Brothers, Brok and Sindri. SungWon Cho also announced that he would be providing the voice and motion capture for the squirrel Ratatoskr, and worked directly with the writers to write his scenes. A day before release, Scott Porter revealed that he played Heimdall, and the game's music composer, Bear McCreary, was also confirmed to play a Dwarf musician named Ræb.

Unlike the popular portrayal of Thor by Chris Hemsworth in the Marvel Cinematic Universe (MCU), the Thor in Ragnarök looks closer to his depiction in Norse mythological literature, having a hefty build with long red hair and beard. This type of portrayal was similarly done for the other Norse gods such as Odin himself, shown as a softly spoken and somewhat friendly middle aged man, as in the literature, the Norse gods were not as flashy as the Greek gods were. In portraying Thor, Hurst took inspiration from another Marvel Comics character, Hulk, citing his rage and power. He also took inspiration from Tommy Lee Jones' character in No Country for Old Men (2007), Sheriff Ed Tom Bell, noting how he was a powerful character that harbored regret.

Pre-release fan backlash
Following the announcement that Ragnarök had been delayed to 2022, Santa Monica's developers received harassment from some fans, including threatening messages. The delay was announced shortly after Alanah Pearce revealed her involvement on Ragnarök. Pearce was blamed for the delay and she received threatening messages of sexual harassment. Cory Barlog came to her defense—and all of Santa Monica's developers—stating that he made the call to delay the game and that it had nothing to do with lower-level staff. Furthermore, after a rumor circulated that Santa Monica would reveal the release date towards the end of June 2022, and that date passed, some developers received explicit images from angry fans in an attempt to get them to reveal the release date.

Additionally, the reveal that Angrboda would be black was controversial to some fans. They claimed that since the game is set in Scandinavia, she should have been white. The developers, however, defended the decision due to the diversity of the Dwarves in the game, among other changes such as Mímir having a Scottish accent, and the fact that the character of Angrboda is of a mythological race with a power of transformation.

There was also some backlash to the reveal that Ragnarök would be released on both the PS4 and PS5 due to concerns that the PS4 version would hold back the PS5 version. Comparing the situation to what happened with 2007's God of War II, which had released exclusively on the PlayStation 2 although the PlayStation 3 had already been out for a few months, Barlog said that despite not releasing on the newer console at the time, it still worked out well for that game.

Soundtrack

God of War Ragnarök (Original Soundtrack) was released on November 9, 2022, by Sony Classical Records and was also included in the game's special editions. It was composed by Bear McCreary, returning from the previous game. The soundtrack features Faroese singer Eivør on the tracks "God of War Ragnarök", "Holding On", "Svartalfheim", "Pull of the Light", and "Remembering Faye". McCreary had previously featured Eivør on the 2018 installment's soundtrack. 

Irish folk artist Hozier is featured on the track, "Blood Upon the Snow", which was Hozier's first contribution to a video game soundtrack. Hozier was particularly interested in working on the song as he was a fan of the series and also interested in the maturing medium of digital arts. He was also familiar with McCreary's other works. Due to Hozier being signed with Sony's Columbia Records in the United States, he was approached by Sony to contribute to Ragnarök. To help in composing the song, the game's director Eric Williams talked Hozier through the character arcs of Kratos and Atreus. Hozier was also inspired by nature and the natural world. In working with McCreary, Hozier said they were able to find a balance so that the song was "not too elegiac, not too much of an elegy, not too sweet, not too lullaby-esque, not too outrageously doom and gloom, and not too absolutely metal". Paolo Ragusa of Consequence described the song as "a daring, cinematic number that hits at all the thematic notes of God of War: Ragnarök, and finds Hozier using his signature velvety tone to evoke both tenderness and awe". Hozier and McCreary performed the song live at The Game Awards on December 8, 2022.

Release
God of War Ragnarök was released worldwide on November 9, 2022, for the PlayStation 4 and PlayStation 5. Players who purchase the PS4 version can upgrade to the PS5 version for US$10. In addition to the standard base game (physical and digital), there are three special editions: the Jötnar Edition, the Collector's Edition, and the Digital Deluxe Edition. Early copies of the base game were also marketed as a Launch Edition and included the Risen Snow Armor and Tunic skins for Kratos and Atreus, respectively, which are also included with the three special editions. Pre-orders for all versions opened on July 15, 2022.

The items in both the Jötnar Edition and the Collector's Edition are housed within a box called the Knowledge Keeper's Shrine (a shrine featured in the game). Both editions include a SteelBook game case; however, they do not include a physical copy of the game, only digital versions for both platforms. The centerpiece of both editions is a 16-inch replica of Thor's hammer Mjölnir, and both also include 2-inch carvings of the Vanir twins (Freya and Freyr). Physical items exclusive to the Jötnar Edition include a 7-inch vinyl record of music by Bear McCreary, a pin set of a Falcon, Bear, and Wolf (which represent Faye, Kratos, and Atreus, respectively), a replica Draupnir ring, Brok’s dice set, and a Yggdrasil cloth map which shows each of the nine realms. Instead of Brok's dice set, the Collector's Edition has a Dwarven dice set. The Digital Deluxe Edition includes the Darkdale armor and weapon skins for Kratos and Atreus, the official God of War Ragnarök soundtrack, a mini art book by Dark Horse Comics, a PlayStation Network avatar set, and a PS4 background theme; all of this downloadable content (DLC) is also included with both physical special editions.

Available separately is a limited edition Ragnarök themed DualSense controller for the PS5. Additionally, two PS5 bundles were available the same day as the game's release. One bundle is for the disc version of the console while the other is for the digital version, with both including a regular DualSense controller and a voucher code to download the standard version of the game. Furthermore, an official art book from Dark Horse Comics titled The Art of God of War Ragnarök, in both a standard and deluxe edition, was released on November 29, 2022.

Since launch, Santa Monica has supported the game with patch updates to address software bugs. As well, the developers have added new features along with these free updates. A photo mode, which was revealed prior to launch, was added as part of update patch 3.00 on December 5, 2022. It allows players to take customized in-game screenshots adjusting, among other things, the field of view, depth of view, filters, and the visibility and facial expressions of most major characters. A New Game Plus mode will be added in spring 2023.

Reception

God of War Ragnarök on PS5 received "universal acclaim", according to review aggregator Metacritic, garnering a score of 94/100. This ties it with both the original 2005 installment and the 2018 installment for the highest Metacritic score in the series. The game was praised for its storytelling, characters, visuals, level design, and overall improvements to the gameplay over its predecessor. Most reviewers agree that it excelled over the 2018 installment in many aspects, and that it was a fitting end to the Norse era of the series. The game was, however, subject to minor criticism, such as the excessive hints during puzzles, as well as some gameplay mechanics. 

Tamoor Hussain of GameSpot opined that out of all the many different takes on Norse mythology, Ragnaröks is "easily one of the most memorable", and it is elevated due to Kratos and his past life as a Greek god and the perspective that brings. He said the most impressive things about the game were the "exploration of loss and love; grief and growth; [and] determinism and defiance". He added that the game was well-written and it takes Norse mythology, deconstructs it, and rebuilds it as an epic story about families. Although the game is long, he claimed that the "writing and characterization" made the length worth it. Kyle Hilliard at Game Informer wrote that although Ragnarök did not have the same unique impact that the 2018 installment had, everything that worked well in that prior game is here, and along with the story, the sequel is truly an "epic". Eurogamers Chris Tapsell, however, felt that because Ragnarök tried to include as much of the series history as possible, the game can feel "both bloated and crowded". The bloat is what he said was the game's biggest problem, as the story could have been told in half the time. However, he positively noted that due to its length, it meant that there was more of the game to play. He also positively compared it to a theme park, due to the many different things that can be experienced in the game.

Writing for IGN, Simon Cardy said that Ragnarök provided fresh interpretations of well-known Norse mythological characters, such as Odin and Thor, and the unique take and the portrayal by the actors did not have Cardy thinking about their popular MCU counterparts. Hussain elaborated that because of the blurred line between good and evil, the characters are compelling throughout the story, and because the game has players empathizing with the antagonists, it makes the "story so captivating". He also said that the "superb writing and acting" made the interactions between Kratos and Atreus, as well as Mimír, more interesting, coming off their experiences in the previous game. Hilliard was also impressed with the writing, stating it "outdoes the already fantastic dialogue of the 2018 game". He also said that surprisingly, it was the funniest God of War to date.

In terms of gameplay, Ragnarök does not make any drastic changes over the 2018 installment, but there are some new additions to the existing mechanics. Hussain said that while the core gameplay is fundamentally the same, this is in Ragnaröks favor, as it made it easy to begin playing the game. Tapsell, however, was somewhat critical of the combat, stating that he would have liked a more systematic approach, and although there is synergy across the weapons' skills, there is practically no room for expression. Conversely, Hussain said that even hours into the game, the Leviathan Axe had not lost any thrill, and the new skill tree creates new, harder hitting combos. He also praised being able to use the Blades of Chaos from the start, as they are great for crowd-control, but their use was also expanded for mobility and verticality, allowing the player to get in close-range on enemies but also ascend elevated platforms. Being able to perform a weapon attack when leaping off a ledge was also a welcomed addition. Cardy agreed and said that this added another layer to battles. He was also very positive about the combat, stating "It's all unapologetically fast, and undeniably glorious", harking back to the series roots. He said that while the Leviathan Axe largely feels the same as it did in the 2018 installment, the Blades of Chaos have a more similar feel to how they performed in the Greek games, calling them nostalgic but with a "brilliant modern edge". The update to the shield was also praised, with Hussain stating that it "enhances the offensive feel of combat". Cardy similarly felt the shield was more of an offensive tool, and that parrying is a fantastic feeling and "a skill [the player will] want to perfect". Hilliard opined that the only negative thing about the gameplay was that it was not much different from the previous game. The variety of enemies and bosses were also praised among the reviewers.

While praising the RPG elements for allowing players to cater to their own play style, Hussain said there was nothing "game-changing or innovative" in the system. Tapsell had a similar opinion, saying that while there were some new ideas and there are some fun character builds that could be made, nothing is really memorable or expressive like in other RPGs, and players can get by without engaging much with it. Cardy, however, said the system was more streamlined which made it easier to see what all the player has equipped, and felt the game encouraged players to make their own custom builds. He praised it for being accessible and not overwhelming. Writing for PCMag, Clay Halton was critical of the system, stating it was the game's "most tedious aspect", as it can be difficult to determine which weapon or armor piece needs upgraded. He said this was an issue in the prior game, but it was more complicated in the sequel.

Hussain did have criticism over some gameplay mechanics, as later in the game when the enemies become more stronger and greater in number, "the mechanics can struggle under the pressure of the increased speed and aggression". He said players can feel as if they are being pulled in multiple directions which makes it much harder to form a defense, especially when an enemy attacks from behind off-screen. Hussain said it felt like it broke the flow of combat. Tapsell had similar comments, and stated it can be a hindrance in battle. During some of these sequences, however, Hussain did praise the AI of Atreus as being more capable than in the previous game. Despite these minor gripes, Hussain said the combat is pacier and more dynamic than previous games. Tapsell shared a criticism of many reviewers and players, which was that although he loved the puzzles, the accompanying character offers excessive hints to solve the puzzles, and they offer the hints too soon, barely giving the player any time to think about a solution. Cardy also found the excessive hints an annoyance, stating it can rob the player of the satisfaction of solving a puzzle on their own.

The environments were also well-praised. Hussain said that "each realm has a grand sense of scale". He also praised the changes to the returning realms from the previous game, as not only did they show the effects of Fimbulwinter, but they provided new areas to explore. Tapsell shared similar sentiments and said that the realms were more varied, describing them as "less oppressive and so more inviting for your eventual return, and gloriously colourful but importantly, playful with that colour". He also said the sense of scale was missing in the 2018 installment, but Ragnarök resolved that, saying that its "dramatic might comes from its unique access to a sense of scale". Halton said that although it is not noticably different from the prior game, largely due to Ragnarök releasing on both the PS4 and PS5, the game is still beautiful, saying that each realm and their respective environments are "thoughtfully crafted".

Sales
The PlayStation 5 version of God of War Ragnarök was the third bestselling retail game during its first week of release in Japan, with 29,377 physical copies being sold. The PlayStation 4 version was the sixth bestselling retail game in the country throughout the same week, selling 11,260 physical copies. In the United Kingdom (UK), although the exact sales numbers were not revealed, it was reported that Ragnarök sold more physical copies on its first day than any previous God of War title did in their first week, with 82% of the total sold on PS5 and 18% on PS4. Of the PS5 sales, 12% came from the PS5 bundles. Additionally, it sold 51% more in its first week than the 2018 installment did. This made Ragnarök the biggest launch in the series in the UK, which was largely due to it being the first cross-gen release in the series. In terms of physical copies, it was the country's second biggest launch of the year, behind FIFA 23, and it had a bigger launch than Call of Duty: Modern Warfare II, Elden Ring, and Pokémon Legends: Arceus. By the end of 2022, 670,617 copies of the game had been sold in the UK, making it the sixth best selling game of the year in the country. Ragnarök became the fastest-selling first-party game in PlayStation history, selling 5.1 million units in its opening week. In Germany, the game had sold more than 200,000 copies by the end of December 2022. By February 1, 2023, the game had sold 11 million copies worldwide.

Awards
At the 2020 Golden Joystick Awards, the game received the award for Most Wanted Game. That same year, it also received the award for PlayStation.Blog's Most Anticipated Game. It was also a nominee for Most Anticipated Game at The Game Awards in both 2020 and 2021. Various media outlets also included the sequel on their respective lists for most anticipated games of 2021, prior to the game's delay to the following year. It was a nominee for Ultimate Game of the Year at the 2022 Golden Joystick Awards, and was named as Time magazine's #1 game of the year. At The Game Awards 2022, Ragnarök won six of its 11 nominations, which was both the most nominations and most awards won at the event. It was nominated for Game of the Year and won Best Narrative and Innovation in Accessibility. Christopher Judge also won Best Performance with Sunny Suljic a nominee for the same award. The game did win Game of the Year at the 2022 Titanium Awards.

Future
Prior to the release of the 2018 installment, Cory Barlog said that after the Norse era of God of War, future games could see the series tackling either Egyptian or Maya mythology. He said the 2018 installment alluded to other mythologies co-existing in the world, including Celtic, Japanese, and Irish mythology.

Notes

References

External links
 
 
 
 

2022 video games
Action-adventure games
The Game Awards winners
Golden Joystick Award winners
God of War (franchise)
Hack and slash games
PlayStation 4 games
PlayStation 5 games
Santa Monica Studio games
Single-player video games
Sony Interactive Entertainment games
Video game sequels
Video games based on Norse mythology
Video games developed in the United States
Video games postponed due to the COVID-19 pandemic
Video games set in Norway
Video games set in the Viking Age
Interactive Achievement Award winners